Help Me Dream (Italian: Aiutami a sognare) is a 1981 Italian romance film directed by Pupi Avati and starring Mariangela Melato, Anthony Franciosa and Orazio Orlando.

For this film Mariangela Melato was awarded with a David di Donatello for Best Actress and a Nastro d'Argento in the same category. The musical score of Riz Ortolani won the Nastro d'Argento for Best Score.

In 1943 during the Second World War a woman leaves Bologna to escape the bombing raids and goes to live in her country villa.

Main Cast 
Mariangela Melato as Francesca
Anthony Franciosa as Ray
Orazio Orlando as Guido
Jean-Pierre Léaud as Mario
Paola Pitagora as Giovanna
Alexandra Stewart as Magda
Franca Tamantini as Tonina
 Vincenzo Crocitti
 Anna Melato

References

Bibliography
 Antonio Maraldi. Il cinema di Pupi Avati. Il ponte vecchio, 2003.

External links

1981 films
Films directed by Pupi Avati
Italian drama films
Films scored by Riz Ortolani
1981 drama films
Italian World War II films
Films set in the 1940s
Titanus films
1980s Italian-language films
1980s Italian films